Paenanthracotherium was a genus of anthracothere that lived in Europe and Asia during the Oligocene.

Taxonomy
The type species of the genus is Paenanthracotherium bergeri. The species "Anthracotherium" hippoideum and "Brachyodus" strategus have been reassigned to this genus based on similarities with P. bergeri.

Distribution
Fossils of Paenanthracotherium are known from France, Germany, Pakistan, Romania, and Switzerland.

References

Anthracotheres
Oligocene even-toed ungulates
Oligocene mammals of Asia
Oligocene mammals of Europe
Prehistoric even-toed ungulate genera